Zhang Bin (born 22 September 1969) is a Chinese modern pentathlete. He competed at the 1988 and 1992 Summer Olympics.

References

External links
 

1969 births
Living people
Chinese male modern pentathletes
Olympic modern pentathletes of China
Modern pentathletes at the 1988 Summer Olympics
Modern pentathletes at the 1992 Summer Olympics
Modern pentathletes at the 1994 Asian Games
Asian Games competitors for China
20th-century Chinese people
21st-century Chinese people